Gastón Gaudio defeated Guillermo Coria in the final, 0–6, 3–6, 6–4, 6–1, 8–6 to win the men's singles tennis title at the 2004 French Open. Gaudio became the first Argentine to win a major since Guillermo Vilas at the 1979 Australian Open. Gaudio came back from two sets down, saved two championship points, and twice broke Coria's serve when the latter served for the championship.

Juan Carlos Ferrero was the defending champion, but was defeated in the second round by Igor Andreev, in what was his first loss at the French Open prior to the semifinals.

This was the first major where Roger Federer competed as the world No. 1. He lost in the third round to former No. 1 and three-time champion Gustavo Kuerten, in his last pre-quarterfinal exit from a major until the 2013 Wimbledon Championships, a run of 36 quarterfinals or better in a row. This was the most recent French Open not to feature future 14-time champion Rafael Nadal, who withdrew prior to the tournament due to an ankle injury sustained in Estoril in mid-April.

This was the first major in the Open Era to feature four Argentines in the quarterfinals, those being Gaudio, Coria, David Nalbandian, and Juan Ignacio Chela.

Wayne Ferreira matched Stefan Edberg's all-time record on his 54th consecutive major main draw appearance.

The first round match between Fabrice Santoro and Arnaud Clément was the then-longest match of the Open Era, lasting 6 hours and 33 minutes and played over two days. John Isner and Nicolas Mahut would later break this record with their first-round singles match at the 2010 Wimbledon Championships.

Seeds

Qualifying

Draw

Finals

Top half

Section 1

Section 2

Section 3

Section 4

Bottom half

Section 5

Section 6

Section 7

Section 8

References

External links
Official Roland Garros 2004 Men's Singles Draw
Main Draw
Qualifying Draw
2004 French Open – Men's draws and results at the International Tennis Federation

Men's Singles
French Open by year – Men's singles
2004 ATP Tour